Nobéré is a department or commune of Zoundwéogo Province in central Burkina Faso.  Nobéré Department is located directly west of Guiba Department.

Towns and villages
The capital of Nobéré Department is the town of Nobéré.

References

Departments of Burkina Faso
Zoundwéogo Province